Suyi Davies Okungbowa (born Osasuyi Okungbowa in 1989) is a Nigerian fantasy, science fiction and speculative writer and academic. He is the author of The Nameless Republic epic fantasy trilogy, beginning with Son of the Storm (Orbit, May 2021). His debut was the godpunk fantasy novel, David Mogo, Godhunter (Abaddon, July 2019). He has also written works for younger readers under the author name Suyi Davies, including Minecraft: The Haven Trials. His work is heavily influenced by the histories and cultures of West Africa and Nigeria, and discusses themes of identity, challenging difference and finding home. WIRED referred to him as "one of the most promising new voices coterie of African SFF writers." He is an Assistant Professor of Creative Writing at the University of Ottawa.

Early life 
Okungbowa was born to Prof. and Prof. Mrs. Okungbowa, as the first son and raised in Benin City, Edo State in the southern part of Nigeria. His early life orbited the University of Benin, after which he went on to obtain a Bachelor's in Civil Engineering from the same university between 2006 and 2011. He later moved to Lagos, then went on to study at the University of Arizona in Tucson for an MFA in Creative Writing.

Personal life 

Okungbowa currently lives and works in Ottawa, Canada. Prior to that, he spent time in the U.S., the U.K. and in various cities in Nigeria. He has also worked in various fields, from engineering to professional services to marketing communications to digital learning. He is currently an Assistant Professor of Creative Writing at the University of Ottawa in Ontario. He is married.

David Mogo, Godhunter (Abaddon, 2019) 

Okungbowa's debut novel, David Mogo, Godhunter was released by the Abaddon imprint of Rebellion Publishing on July 9, 2019 in the US and two days later in the UK and Europe. The novel follows the titular demigod, who is also a god hunter, as he scours the streets of Okungbowa's native Lagos, Nigeria, in the aftermath of an event called The Falling where thousands of orishas have fallen to the city.

The novel received good reception, with venues like WIRED commenting that, "a number of books have been termed 'godpunk,' but Suyi Davies Okungbowa's novel may be the subgenre's platonic deific ideal," while Publishers Weekly mentioned that "this story is captivating, and readers who enjoy non-Western fantasy, mythpunk, and tales of found family will find it delightful." However, there were critical mentions of the story structure, which was a novel in three parts, almost akin to a collection of novellas ('s Giancarlo Riccobon called it "three books for the price of one") and the treatment of some of the minor characters. But overall, the consensus was that the authorial voice was fresh and welcome, especially in a white-dominated sub-genre.

"American urban fantasy, like any established genre, can get predictable," L.E.H Light of BlackNerdProblems said in a lengthy, favourable review. "David Mogo, Godhunter is anything but."

In October 2020, David Mogo, Godhunter was announced as the winner of the 2020 Nommo Award for Best Speculative Novel by an African (the Ilube Award).

The Nameless Republic trilogy (Orbit, 2021-present) 
In January 2020, Orbit Books (a science fiction and fantasy imprint of Hachette Book Group, USA and Little, Brown UK) announced the acquisition of "an incredible new epic fantasy series" from Okungbowa. They referred to The Nameless Republic as "an evocative tale of myth and magic [that] invites readers into a rich and vibrant world inspired by West-African empires." Okungbowa himself commented: "This series is my love letter to all of us who know the magic that makes West-Africa tick–the lore and music, the harmattan and petrichor, the jollof rice and fried plantain."

Son of the Storm 
The first book in the trilogy, Son of the Storm, was released in May 2021, to mostly positive acclaim. NPR Books said of it: "Okungbowa's control of power, relationships, plot twists, and politics throughout gets high marks." Library Journal, which gave the novel a starred review, highly recommended it for "fans of epic fantasy based on non-European mythologies...readers who enjoy protagonists on troubled journeys...or anyone who likes to chew on stories with complex shenanigans." Tor.com's Alex Brown said it was "epic fantasy that breaks the rules," praising Okungbowa's worldbuilding and attention to detail. Publishers Weekly called it a "series starter [that] promises more good things to come."

Warrior of the Wind 
The second novel in the trilogy is scheduled to be published November 2023.

Other works 
Okungbowa also writes for young audiences under the author name Suyi Davies, disclosing that he "decided to separate my works for younger audiences from my work for adult audiences in this way." His first full-length work for younger audiences is the middle-grade novel, Minecraft: The Haven Trials. Prior to this, he published shorter works in collections like Black Boy Joy.

He has a YA novel about Stranger Things character Lucas Sinclair called Lucas on the Line coming out on July 26, 2022. 

As an academic, Okungbowa has also published various papers and essays of a scholarly nature.

Partial bibliography

Novels 

Warrior of the Wind (The Nameless Republic #2), 2023
Son of the Storm (The Nameless Republic #1), 2021
Minecraft: The Haven Trials, 2021
David Mogo, Godhunter, 2019 (winner of the 2020 Nommo Award for Best Novel)
Stranger Things: Lucas on the Line, 2022

Selected short work 

 "Sleep Papa, Sleep," in Dominion: An Anthology of Speculative Fiction From Africa and the African Diaspora
 "The Case of the Moaning Marquee," in Travel Anthology to the Most (Fictional) Haunted Buildings in the Weird, Wild World
"Five Thousand Light-Years to Home," in Black Boy Joy
"Stronger In Spirit," in Black Panther: Tales of Wakanda
"Mytek the Mighty" (comic) in 2000AD Smash! Special
"The Secret Life of the Unclaimed," in A World of Horror
"The Haunting of 13 Oluwo Street," in Fireside Magazine
 "Dune Song," in Apex Magazine (Also: Year's Best Science Fiction and Fantasy, ed by Jonathan Strahan, 2020)
 "Where Are Our Black Boys on Young Adult Science Fiction and Fantasy Novel Covers?" in Tor.com
"'Post' for Whom? Examining the Socioeconomics of a Post-Apocalypse" in Strange Horizons

References

External links 

 Official website
 Interview with The Imaginaries Podcast
Profile in the San Francisco Chronicle
 Suyi Davies Okungbowa on the Internet Speculative Fiction Database

1989 births
Nigerian fantasy writers
Living people
21st-century Nigerian writers
Nigerian writers
Nommo Award winners